Alberto Judas Pardo (born September 8, 1962) is a Spanish former catcher in Major League Baseball for the Baltimore Orioles and the Philadelphia Phillies. , he is one of only four players in Major League history to have been born in Spain.

Pardo played baseball at Jefferson High School in Tampa, Florida where he was teammates with Fred McGriff.

The only home run in his career came against Chicago White Sox pitcher Joe Cowley.

References

External links

1962 births
Living people
Sportspeople from Oviedo
Major League Baseball catchers
Baltimore Orioles players
Philadelphia Phillies players
Hagerstown Suns players
Sportspeople from Asturias
Major League Baseball players from Spain
Thomas Jefferson High School (Tampa, Florida) alumni
Bluefield Orioles players
Charlotte O's players
Jackson Mets players
Leones de Yucatán players
Maine Phillies players
Mercuries Tigers players
Miami Orioles players
Richmond Braves players
Rochester Red Wings players
Scranton/Wilkes-Barre Red Barons players
Tidewater Tides players
Baseball players from Tampa, Florida
American expatriate baseball players in Taiwan
American expatriate baseball players in Mexico
Spanish expatriate sportspeople in Mexico